Moses Angel (born 29 April 1819 – died 1898, Hammersmith, London, England) was headmaster at the Jews' Free School (JFS) in Bell Lane, Spitalfields from 1842 until 1897. He has been described as "the single most significant figure in Anglo-Jewish religious and secular education in the 19th century".

Angel published several books, including one on the Torah in 1858. He was one of the first editors of The Jewish Chronicle in the early 1840s. In this, he was associated with then- Haham, Rabbi David Meldola.

Early life and education

Angel was educated at H. Solomon's Boarding School at Hammersmith and entered University College School in Bloomsbury at the age of fourteen. After further study at University College London, he became a bank clerk and then took up teaching. Despite a family scandal (his father had been transported for robbery), he became the respected headmaster of the JFS in the East End.

Career at JFS

In 1840, with the retirement of the Rev. H. A. Henry, he was appointed Master of the Talmud Torah department of the JFS, and, soon after, he was made Headmaster of the entire school.

In the same year he instituted two Teacher-Training departments in the School. He was advisor to the National Education Department. He was a strict disciplinarian who kept a close watch on most activities at the school. Shouldering an enormous administrative burden, he still found time to teach reading, writing, grammar, geography, history, arithmetic, algebra, and chemistry.

Angel was meticulous in recording of daily events in school journals – those dating from 1863 till his death in 1898 are still in existence.

Angel's long association with the Jewish Free School (JFS) saw the school grow through some important changes. The introduction in 1870 of a national system of Board Schools funded by local taxes – the predecessors of the current county schools – seemed at first to threaten the existence of voluntary schools like JFS, which relied largely on donations. Despite fears the voluntary schools survived, and JFS grew in strength.

The school grew to an astonishing 2,400 pupils by 1870. In fact the school met more needs than ever before, in the 1880s and 1890s, the mass exodus of Jews from Eastern Europe placed enormous demands on housing and social welfare in the East End. Not all immigrant children could be accommodated at JFS. Matthew Arnold, the Schools' Inspector, was greatly impressed by it. Angel did much to integrate immigrant Jewish children into the mainstream of English society.

It is believed JFS took in approximately a third of the children of the East End in the closing stages of the 1800s and, by 1900, it had over 4,000 pupils on its register.

Moses Angel impressed his vision on the school during this period. By the early 1890s, more than a third of his pupils had been born abroad and, of those born in England, most were the children of recently arrived immigrants, while many were still struggling with English and all the problems that a new way of life would bring.

Although he was intent on keeping the Jewish faith alive among his pupils, Angel was unswerving in his conviction that they should adopt English culture and tradition. He strongly discouraged the use of Yiddish. The attempt to eradicate Yiddish was clearly successful. Within two generations, there were few even in the East End who spoke it comfortably. Yiddish theatre continued to serve as a sentimental reminder of a lost culture, but gradually became a minority taste.

When, in December 1897, failing health compelled the retirement of Moses Angel, Louis Barnett Abrahams was elected headmaster of the school, while Moses Angel became principal and on his death in September 1898, Abrahams succeeded him.

Family

Angel married Rebekah Godfrey on 11 January 1843 and they had 3 sons and 3 daughters.

Moses's parents were Emmanuel and Sarah Moses and Angel was one of 11 children. Criminal proceedings against a family member probably led to the reversal of his name.

On 21 August 1867 at the residence of the bride's parents, John Hart of 7 St Paul's Road, Canonbury, son of Isaac Hart, married Maria Hannah, daughter of Mr and Mrs Moses Angel of 1 King Street, Finsbury.

Publications
The Law of Sinai and Its Appointed Times (1858), being a commentary on the Pentateuch
The Pentateuch a series of articles written for the Jewish Record

References

External links
Migration histories
Moses Angel and the Jew's Free School
The future of Jewish schooling in the United Kingdom
Jewish Free School history
Jewish Encyclopedia
Anglo-Jewish Miscellanies

1819 births
1898 deaths
English Sephardi Jews
People from Hammersmith
People educated at University College School
Alumni of University College London